Bukovnica (Prekmurje Slovene: Bükovnica) is a village northeast of Bogojina in the Municipality of Moravske Toplice in the Prekmurje region of Slovenia.

There is a small chapel on the western outskirts of the settlement dedicated to the Holy Cross.

References

External links 
Bukovnica on Geopedia

Populated places in the Municipality of Moravske Toplice